The 2022 Asian Road Cycling Championships took place in Dushanbe, Tajikistan from 25 to 30 March 2022.

Medal summary

Men

Women

Medal table

References

External links
ACC 

Asian Cycling Championships
Asia
Cycling
Cycling
Asian Road Cycling Championships